Danger Ahead is a 1923 American silent crime drama film directed by William K. Howard and starring Richard Talmadge, Helene Rosson, and J.P. Lockney.

Plot
As described in a film magazine review, Bruce Randall fights with Mortimer when he finds him trying to rob his home, and Randall is injured and wanders away, losing all memory of his past. He is reported as being dead and falls into the hands of two unscrupulous lawyers. They induce him to impersonate Bruce Randall (himself) in order to obtain some pearls. Mrs. Randall accepts him as being her husband. Later his memory is restored and the swindlers defeated, with husband and wife reunited.

Cast
 Richard Talmadge as Bruce Randall
 Helene Rosson as Mrs. Randall
 J.P. Lockney as Todd
 David Kirby as Mahoney
 Fred R. Stanton as Mortimer

References

Bibliography
 Connelly, Robert B. The Silents: Silent Feature Films, 1910-36, Volume 40, Issue 2. December Press, 1998.
 Munden, Kenneth White. The American Film Institute Catalog of Motion Pictures Produced in the United States, Part 1. University of California Press, 1997.

External links

1923 films
1923 crime films
American silent feature films
American crime films
American black-and-white films
Films directed by William K. Howard
1920s English-language films
1920s American films